The Utopian Society is a 2003 film directed by John P. Aguirre and starring Sam Doumit, Austin Nichols, Malin Åkerman, Mat Hostetler, Kelvin Yu, and Kirsten Ariza. It was re-released by Warner Brothers in 2008.

Plot 
The Utopian Society is about a group of college students who are put together by their professor to complete a final project: create a utopian society. Like most college students, they’ve waited until the night before it is due to start working on it.  They each come from different backgrounds and have pre-existing assumptions about the others, causing them to want to spend as little time working with each other as possible.  But since they have waited until the last minute to start working, they are forced to cram an entire semester's work into one night, whether they like it or not.

Cast 
 Sam Doumit as Nera 
 Austin Nichols as Justin Mathers 
 Malin Åkerman as Tanci 
 Mat Hostetler as Caleb 
 Kelvin Yu as Ken 
 Kristen Ariza as Aaliyah 
 Robert Romanus as Barry

Awards 
DV Awards (UT):WINNER - Best Long Form Drama
RAD Digital Film Festival (Los Angeles, CA):WINNER - Best Feature Drama/Comedy
Independents Film Festival (Tampa, FL):WINNER - Best Feature
Texas Film Festival (College Station, Texas):WINNER - Audience Award
Fargo Film Festival (Fargo, ND):WINNER - Audience Award
DIY Awards (Los Angeles, CA):WINNER - Best Cinematography
The Honolulu Film Festival (Honolulu, HI):WINNER - Best Direction
Back East Picture Show (Hoboken, NJ):WINNER - Best Screenplay
Wine Country Film Festival (Napa/Sonoma, CA):WINNER - Best First Feature
Great Lakes Film Festival (Erie, Pennsylvania):WINNER - Founder's Vision Award

Nominated
Ashland Film Festival (Ashland, OR):NOMINATED - Best Acting Ensemble & Best Cinematography
Phoenix Film Festival (Phoenix, AZ):NOMINATED - Best Acting Ensemble

References

External links
Official website

2003 films
American independent films
2000s English-language films
2000s American films